Jeffrey Doyle Sellers (born May 11, 1964) is a former professional baseball pitcher. He played in Major League Baseball (MLB) for the Boston Red Sox.

Biography
Sellers played high school baseball for Paramount High School in California, and was drafted by the Red Sox after graduating in 1982.

In a four-season major league career (1985–1988), Sellers posted a 13–22 record with 226 strikeouts and a 4.97 ERA in  innings pitched, including seven complete games and two shutouts.

On October 1, 1988, Sellers flirted with a no-hitter through  innings until Luis Medina of the Cleveland Indians hit a home run accounting for the only run in a 1–0 victory over the Red Sox. Sellers struck out 10 Cleveland batters in the losing effort, which turned out to be his last major league appearance.

Before the 1989 season, Sellers, Todd Benzinger, and a minor leaguer were sent by Boston to the Cincinnati Reds in the same transaction that brought Nick Esasky and Rob Murphy to the Red Sox. But Sellers suffered an injury the following spring and did not play in MLB for the Reds. He went on to play in the minor league systems of the Reds, New York Yankees, Texas Rangers and Colorado Rockies before retiring for good after the 1994 season.

Jeff Sellers is the father of Justin Sellers, a former infielder for the Los Angeles Dodgers.

References

External links

Boston Red Sox players
Major League Baseball pitchers
Baseball players from California
1964 births
Living people
Elmira Pioneers players
Winter Haven Red Sox players
New Britain Red Sox players
Pawtucket Red Sox players
Nashville Sounds players
Columbus Clippers players
Tulsa Drillers players
Central Valley Rockies players